The Montreal Eaton Centre is a shopping mall located in Montreal, Quebec, Canada. It is located in the downtown core within the borough of Ville-Marie, and is accessible through the Underground City, and is connected to the Montreal Metro via McGill station.

The Montreal Eaton Centre opened on November 14, 1990. In 2018, it absorbed its adjacent sister mall Complexe Les Ailes and the two shopping centres were combined into a single property which retained the Montreal Eaton Centre name. As such, the property consists of two separate buildings at 677 Saint Catherine Street West (the former Eaton's flagship store which became the Complexe Les Ailes mall in 2002) and 705 Saint Catherine Street West (the former Les Terrasses mall, which became the original Montreal Eaton Centre).

The building features an additional  of office space on the upper levels, branded as "1500 University." A bronze statue of hockey player Ken Dryden and a three-storeys-tall tableau made by fine arts enamel painter Bernard Séguin Poirier are located in the mall.

History

Les Terrasses

The site at 705 Saint Catherine Street West originally featured a shopping mall name "Les Terrasses" from 1976 to 1987. It was built atop the now-defunct Victoria Street; the road and its buildings were expropriated for construction of the mall. Though it had three escalators, one at each point of the triangle, patrons could gradually walk to the top of the mall. Floors were colour-coded and the mall was adorned with trees, plants and ivy. It housed 140 stores, each facing towards the centre of the triangle. Les Terrasses was demolished after only one decade of use and, following extensive construction, reopened as the Montreal Eaton Centre in 1990. Like Les Terrasses, the new Montreal Eaton Centre was connected to the Montreal Metro, the Underground City, and the Eaton's department store. Eaton's department store, for which it was named, closed in 1999.

The property was managed by Rouses Quebec Corporation Development and York Hannover Development from 1978 to 1993. In September 1997, after the demise of Services de Gestion CEM Inc., Cadillac Fairview took over the shopping centre. In July 2000, Ivanhoé Cambridge (then known as Ivanhoe) acquired the mall through an exchange of assets. Cadillac Fairview ceded the Montreal Eaton Centre in exchange for Ivanhoe's stakes in Carrefour Laval and Promenades Saint-Bruno.

On April 19, 2013, Musée Grévin Montreal, the first overseas Grévin, was opened on the fifth floor of the mall. The museum closed in 2021 due to a decline in visitors amid the COVID-19 pandemic in Montreal.

Goodwin's / Eaton's

The building at 677 Saint Catherine Street West was originally three storeys tall, and was built for the Goodwin's department store in the early 1900s. The building was sold to Eaton's in 1925, at which time it was referred to as the Eaton's building. Through the Ross and Macdonald architecture firm, the first three-floor expansion was completed in 1927, and the second three-floor expansion was completed between 1930 and 1931. The top floor included Eaton's Ninth Floor Restaurant, which features an Art Deco design that was inspired by the dining room of the SS Île-de-France and was created following Jacques Carlu's plans. The building was expanded toward de Maisonneuve Boulevard between 1958 and 1959, and access to the Montreal Metro via McGill station was opened in 1967. The Eaton's building was home to Montreal's largest department store for decades.

In 1999, Ivanhoé Cambridge acquired the property following the closure of the Eaton's chain. After considerable redevelopment work between 2000 and 2002, including gutting and completely redesigning the interior (with only the exterior facade and parts of the 9th floor preserved), this flagship of the Montreal retail scene was transformed into the building known as Complexe Les Ailes and 1500 University. Along with Place Montreal Trust and the Montreal Eaton Centre, Complexe Les Ailes constituted Ivanhoé Cambridge's self-branded Sh3pping trio of shopping malls.

The mall was named after the Les Ailes de la Mode department store which was its main retailer for over a decade and occupied a third of its total area. The store closed in 2016 and was replaced in 2019 by Decathlon which is one of the largest tenants of the current Montreal Eaton Centre.

Unification project
In March 2014, Ivanhoé Cambridge announced it would merge Complexe Les Ailes with the Montreal Eaton Centre, and the newly merged complex would be renamed, dropping the Eaton Centre branding in the process. However, it was later decided that Complexe Les Ailes would just be used to expand the Montreal Eaton Centre, and preserve the latter's name. The two malls will be renovated so that they will have the same "look and feel" once merged. In coming full circle, this change will restore the Eaton's name back to the same building that once housed Montreal's flagship Eaton's department store.

List of anchor stores

See also
Eaton Centre
List of shopping malls in Montreal

References

External links

Art Deco architecture in Canada
Buildings and structures completed in 1927
Downtown Montreal
Eaton's
Landmarks in Montreal
Ross and Macdonald buildings
Shopping malls established in 1990
Shopping malls in Montreal
Department store buildings in Canada
Ivanhoé Cambridge
1990 establishments in Quebec